The 1973 NHL Amateur Draft was the 11th National Hockey League draft. It was the first to be held on a separate day from other league activities on May 15, 1973, at the Mount Royal Hotel in Montreal, Quebec, so it would not overshadow the rest of the league meetings. Previously, the league had held the amateur draft in mid-June. It also marks the second time the meeting took place at the Mount Royal Hotel rather than the Queen Elizabeth Hotel.

Eligible for the draft were all amateur players born before January 1, 1954. The NHL paid a lump sum to the Canadian Amateur Hockey Association to support major junior hockey as a group. Teams could offer a player a contract at any time after the draft without risking re-entry in a future NHL draft.

The last active players in the NHL from this draft class were Lanny McDonald and Bob Gainey, who both retired after the 1988–89 season.

Selections by round
Below are listed the selections in the 1973 NHL amateur draft.

Round one

 The Montreal Canadiens' first-round pick went to the Atlanta Flames as the result of a trade on May 15, 1973, that sent Montreal's two first-round picks and second-round pick in 1973 NHL Amateur Draft to Atlanta in exchange for Atlanta's first-round pick in 1973 NHL Amateur Draft, first-round pick in 1977 NHL Amateur Draft and second-round pick in 1978 NHL Amateur Draft.
 Montreal previously acquired this pick as the result of a trade on June 8, 1972, that sent Montreal's second-round pick in 1972 NHL Amateur Draft (Stan Weir) to California in exchange for California's first-round and second-round picks in 1973 NHL Amateur Draft as settlement of waiver draft payment owed from California to Montreal for California selecting Carol Vadnais in the 1968 intra-league draft.
 The Montreal Canadiens' first-round pick went to the St. Louis Blues as the result of a trade on May 15, 1973, that sent St. Louis' first-round and fourth-round pick in 1973 NHL Amateur Draft and first-round pick in 1975 NHL Amateur Draft in exchange for Montreal's third-round pick in 1973 NHL Amateur Draft and this pick.
 The Montreal previously acquired this pick as the result of a trade on May 15, 1973, that sent Montreal's two first-round picks (#2 - Tom Lysiak) and second-round pick in 1973 NHL Amateur Draft to Atlanta in exchange for Atlanta's first-round pick in 1973 NHL Amateur Draft, first-round pick in 1977 NHL Amateur Draft and second-round pick in 1978 NHL Amateur Draft.
 The Los Angeles Kings' first-round pick went to the Boston Bruins as the result of a trade on May 14, 1969, that sent Ross Lonsberry and Eddie Shack to Los Angeles in exchange for Los Angeles' first round pick in 1973, Ken Turlik and this pick.
 The St. Louis Blues' first-round pick went to the Montreal Canadiens as the result of a trade on May 15, 1973, that sent Montreal's first-round pick (John Davidson) and third-round pick in 1973 NHL Amateur Draft to St. Louis in exchange for St. Louis' fourth-round pick in 1973 NHL Amateur Draft, first-round pick in 1975 NHL Amateur Draft and this pick.
 The Montreal Canadiens' first-round pick went to the Vancouver Canucks as the result of a trade on May 15, 1973, that sent Vancouver's first-round pick in 1974 NHL Amateur Draft in exchange for this pick.
 The Canadiens previously acquired this pick as the result of a trade on June 10, 1968, that sent Minnesota's first-round pick (Dave Gardner) in 1972 NHL Amateur Draft, a player to be named later (Andre Pronovost) and this pick to Montreal in exchange for Danny Grant, Claude Larose and future considerations (Bob Murdoch on May 25, 1971).
 The Philadelphia Flyers' first-round pick went to the Toronto Maple Leafs as the result of a trade on May 15, 1973, that sent Toronto's second-round pick in 1973 and the rights to Bernie Parent to Philadelphia in exchange for future considerations (Doug Favell) and this pick.
 The Boston Bruins' first-round pick went to the Toronto Maple Leafs as the result of a trade on March 3, 1973, that sent Jacques Plante and Toronto's third-round pick in 1973 NHL Amateur Draft in exchange for future considerations (Eddie Johnston) and this pick.
 The Montreal Canadiens' first-round pick went to the Atlanta Flames as the result of a trade on May 15, 1973, that sent Montreal's two first-round picks (#2 - Tom Lysiak) and second-round pick in 1973 NHL Amateur Draft to Atlanta in exchange for Atlanta's first-round pick in 1973 NHL Amateur Draft (#5 - STL - John Davidson), first-round pick in 1977 NHL Amateur Draft and second-round pick in 1978 NHL Amateur Draft.

Round two

 The New York Islanders' second-round pick went to the Montreal Canadiens as the result of a trade on June 6, 1972, that sent Alex Campbell, Denis DeJordy, Glenn Resch and future considerations (Germain Gagnon) to the Islanders in exchange for cash and this pick.
 The Montreal Canadiens' second-round pick went to the Minnesota North Stars as the result of a trade on May 15, 1973, that sent Minnesota's second-round pick in 1975 NHL Amateur Draft in exchange for this pick.
 Montreal previously acquired this pick as the result of a trade on June 8, 1972, that sent Montreal's second-round pick (Stan Weir) in 1972 NHL Amateur Draft to California in exchange for California's first-round (ATL - Tom Lysiak) in 1973 NHL Amateur Draft and this pick as settlement of waiver draft payment owed from California to Montreal for California selecting Carol Vadnais in the 1968 intra-league draft.
 The Toronto Maple Leafs' second-round pick went to the Philadelphia Flyers as the result of a trade on May 15, 1973, that sent Philadelphia's first-round pick (Bob Neely) in 1973 NHL Amateur Draft and future considerations (Doug Favell) to Toronto in exchange for the rights to Bernie Parent and this pick.
 The Montreal Canadiens' second-round pick went to the Atlanta Flames as the result of a trade on May 15, 1973, that sent Atlanta's first-round pick (#5 - STL - John Davidson) in the 1973 NHL Amateur Draft, first-round pick in the 1977 NHL Amateur Draft and second-round pick in the 1978 NHL Amateur Draft to Montreal in exchange for Montreal's two first-round picks (#2 - Tom Lysiak and #16 - Vic Mercredi) in the 1973 NHL Amateur Draft and this pick.
 Montreal previously acquired this pick as the result of a trade on June 16, 1972, that sent Rey Comeau and Lynn Powis to Atlanta for cash and this pick.
 The Los Angeles Kings' second-round pick went to the Montreal Canadiens as the result of a trade on January 26, 1971, that sent Ralph Backstrom to Los Angeles in exchange for Ray Fortin, Gord Labossiere and this pick.

Round three

 The Toronto Maple Leafs' third-round pick went to the Boston Bruins as the result of a trade on March 3, 1973, that sent Boston's first-round pick in 1973 NHL Amateur Draft (Ian Turnbull) and future considerations (Eddie Johnston) to Toronto in exchange for Jacques Plante and this pick.
 The Atlanta Flames' third-round pick went to the Montreal Canadiens as the result of a trade on August 10, 1972, that sent Noel Price to Atlanta in exchange for cash and this pick.
 The Pittsburgh Penguins' third-round pick went to the Detroit Red Wings as the result of a trade on February 25, 1973, that sent Andy Brown to Pittsburgh in exchange for cash and this pick.
 The St. Louis Blues' third-round pick went to the Philadelphia Flyers as the result of a trade on December 14, 1972, that sent Brent Hughes and Pierre Plante to St. Louis in exchange for Andre Dupont and this pick.
 The Montreal Canadiens' third-round pick went to the St. Louis Blues as the result of a trade on May 15, 1973, that sent St. Louis' first-round pick (Bob Gainey) and fourth-round pick in 1973 NHL Amateur Draft and first-round pick in 1975 NHL Amateur Draft to Montreal in exchange for Montreal's first-round pick (John Davidson) in 1973 NHL Amateur Draft and this pick.

Round four

 The St. Louis Blues' fourth-round pick went to the Montreal Canadiens as the result of a trade on May 15, 1973, that sent Montreal's first-round pick (John Davidson) and third-round pick (Bob Gassoff) in 1973 NHL Amateur Draft to St. Louis in exchange for St. Louis' first-round pick (Bob Gainey) in 1973 NHL Amateur Draft, first-round pick in 1975 NHL Amateur Draft and this pick.

Round five

Round six

Round seven

 The New York Rangers' seventh-round pick went to the New York Islanders as the result of a trade on June 6, 1972, that the Islanders' promised to not take certain players in the 1972 NHL Expansion Draft in exchange for Rangers' eight-round pick in the 1973 NHL Amateur Draft and this pick.

Round eight

 The Los Angeles Kings' eighth-round pick went to the Detroit Red Wings as the result of a trade on May 15, 1973, that sent cash to Los Angeles in exchange for this pick.
 The New York Rangers' seventh-round pick went to the New York Islanders as the result of a trade on June 6, 1972, that sent the Islanders' promised to not take certain players in the 1972 NHL Expansion Draft in exchange for Rangers' seventh-round pick in the 1973 NHL Amateur Draft (Denis Andersen) and this pick.

Round nine

 The St. Louis Blues' ninth-round pick went to the Detroit Red Wings as the result of a trade on May 15, 1973, that sent cash to St. Louis in exchange for St. Louis' tenth-round pick in 1973 NHL Amateur Draft and this pick.
 The Buffalo Sabres' ninth-round pick went to the Detroit Red Wings as the result of a trade on May 15, 1973, that sent cash to Buffalo in exchange for Buffalo's tenth-round pick, eleventh-round pick in 1973 NHL Amateur Draft and this pick.
 The New York Rangers' ninth-round pick went to the Chicago Blackhawks as the result of a trade on May 15, 1973, that sent cash to the Rangers in exchange for this pick.

Round ten

 The New York Islanders' tenth-round pick went to the Toronto Maple Leafs as the result of a trade on May 15, 1973, that sent cash to the Islanders in exchange for the Islanders' eleventh-round pick in 1973 NHL Amateur Draft and this pick.
 The Los Angeles Kings' tenth-round pick went to the Atlanta Flames as the result of a trade on June 6, 1972, that the Flames' promised to not take certain players in the 1972 NHL Expansion Draft in exchange for Los Angeles' ninth-round pick in the 1972 NHL Amateur Draft (Jean Lamarre) and this pick.
 The St. Louis Blues' tenth-round pick went to the Detroit Red Wings as the result of a trade on May 15, 1973, that sent cash to St. Louis in exchange for St. Louis' ninth-round pick (Dennis O'Brien) in 1973 NHL Amateur Draft and this pick.
 The Buffalo Sabres' tenth-round pick went to the Detroit Red Wings as the result of a trade on May 15, 1973, that sent cash to Buffalo in exchange for Buffalo's ninth-round (Ray Bibeau), eleventh-round pick in 1973 NHL Amateur Draft and this pick.

Round eleven

 The New York Islanders' eleventh-round pick went to the Toronto Maple Leafs as the result of a trade on May 15, 1973, that sent cash to the Islanders in exchange for the Islanders' tenth-round pick (Lee Palmer) in 1973 NHL Amateur Draft and this pick.
 The Toronto Maple Leafs' eleventh-round pick went to the Minnesota North Stars as the result of a trade on May 15, 1973, that sent cash to Toronto in exchange for this pick.
 The Los Angeles Kings' eleventh-round pick went to the Minnesota North Stars as the result of a trade on May 15, 1973, that sent cash to Los Angeles in exchange for this pick.
 The Buffalo Sabres' eleventh-round pick went to the Detroit Red Wings as the result of a trade on May 15, 1973, that sent cash to Buffalo in exchange for Buffalo's ninth-round (Ray Bibeau), tenth-round pick (Mitch Brandt) in 1973 NHL Amateur Draft and this pick.  The Red Wings passed on making a selection.

Round twelve

Round thirteen

 The New York Rangers' thirteenth-round pick went to the Montreal Canadiens as the result of a trade on May 15, 1973, that sent Montreal's thirteenth-round pick in 1973 NHL Amateur Draft to the Rangers in exchange for this pick.
 The Montreal Canadiens' thirteenth-round pick went to the New York Rangers as the result of a trade on May 15, 1973, that sent the Rangers' thirteenth-round pick (Louis Chiasson) in 1973 NHL Amateur Draft to Montreal in exchange for this pick.  The Rangers passed on making a selection.

Draftees based on nationality

See also
 1973–74 NHL season
 List of NHL players
 1973 WHA Amateur Draft

Notes

References

External links
 HockeyDraftCentral.com
 1973 NHL Amateur Draft player stats at The Internet Hockey Database

Draft
National Hockey League Entry Draft